The Bank of Florence was a wildcat bank located in Florence, Nebraska Territory. It originally operated for three years in the 1850s, and another bank adopted the name and location in 1904. Today the building that housed the bank is the Bank of Florence Museum.  It is listed on the National Register of Historic Places, and is the oldest building in Omaha, Nebraska.

About
The town of Florence was founded on the ruins of Winter Quarters, with dozens of small buildings still intact from the early Mormon pioneer settlement. A speculator's dream, the town was quickly built.

The Bank of Florence was built as a wildcat bank for speculators to make an easy profit. Many of the early investors included members of the land company that founded the nearby town of Saratoga, as well as local businessmen. When the Panic of 1857 hit, many local townspeople and farmers were financially drained.

The building reopened as the Second Bank of Florence in 1904, and was restored as a landmark in the 1980s.

Today the building has been turned into a museum, which is owned and operated by the Florence Historical Foundation.  Visitors can view the main bank floor, the vault, the rooms upstairs that served as the home of the original bank manager, and a restored Florence Telephone Company switchboard.  The bank is open on Saturdays and Sundays 11AM-3PM from May through August and on special event days.  Tours on other days can be arranged by appointment.

See also
List of the oldest buildings in Nebraska

References

External links

Bank of Florence - a.k.a. The Florence "Wildcat" Bank - Historic Florence, includes history and visitation details
A photo of a dollar bill issued by the Bank of Florence from the Smithsonian Institution's National Museum of American History.
James Monroe Parker Historic Florence website. Founding manager of the Bank of Florence.

Landmarks in North Omaha, Nebraska
Banks based in Omaha, Nebraska
National Register of Historic Places in Omaha, Nebraska
Omaha Landmarks
Banks established in 1856
Museums in Omaha, Nebraska
Bank buildings on the National Register of Historic Places in Nebraska
History museums in Nebraska
Bank museums
1856 establishments in Nebraska Territory